Sabah Al Khalid Al Sabah (born 3 March 1953) is a Kuwaiti diplomat and politician who served as the Prime Minister of Kuwait from 2019 to 2022. he served in different governmental posts from 2006 until 2019. He is a senior member of the ruling Al Sabah family.

Early life and education
Sabah was born on 3 March 1953. He is the son of Khalid bin Hamad Al Sabah and Mouza bint Ahmad Al Sabah, daughter of Ahmad bin Jabir Al Sabah, who was the ruler of Kuwait from 1921 to 1950. He is the brother of Mohammad Al Khalid Al Sabah, deputy prime minister and interior minister of Kuwait. His other brother Ahmad Al Khalid Al Sabah is a former deputy prime minister and defense minister.

He holds a bachelor's degree in political sciences which he received from Kuwait University in 1977.

Career

Sabah started his career in 1978, joining the ministry of foreign affairs. Until 1995 he worked at the ministry in various capacities, including being a member of Kuwait's permanent mission to the United Nations (1983–1989). In 1995, he became Kuwait's ambassador to Saudi Arabia and served in the post until 1998. During this period he was also Kuwait's envoy to the Organization of the Islamic Conference (OIC). From 1998 to 2006 he was the chief of the national security.

In July 2006, he was given his first ministerial role and appointed minister of social affairs and labor. He was also the acting foreign minister during this period. His tenure as minister of social affairs and labor lasted until October 2007 when he was named as minister of information. Then he was named an advisor in the Amiri Diwan. In February 2010, he was appointed to the Supreme Petroleum Council.

On 22 October 2011, he became both deputy prime minister and minister of foreign affairs. Sabah replaced Mohammad Al Sabah as foreign minister. In a reshuffle of 14 December 2011 Sabah was also appointed minister of state for cabinet affairs. Later this post was assumed by Mohammad Abdullah Al Mubarak Al Sabah. On 4 August 2013, Sabah was made first deputy prime minister in addition to his post as foreign minister.

On 19 November 2019, Sabah became the 8th prime minister of Kuwait through Emiri decree after the resignation of his predecessor Jaber Al-Mubarak Al-Hamad Al-Sabah. In May 2021, Sabah spoke in favor of a new Kuwaiti law requiring 10 years imprisonment and a fine of 5,000 Kuwaiti Dinar for anyone supporting Israel in real life or on social media. He submitted his cabinet's resignation on 5 April 2022, which the emir accepted on 10 May 2022 with a request to remain in a caretaker capacity.

Personal life
Sabah is married to Aida Salim Al Ali Al Sabah and has two children. Aida Al Sabah is the board chair of Sheikh Salim Al Ali Al Sabah Informatics Award.

Honours and awards
  (Saudi Arabia): Order of King Abdulaziz (1998)
  (United Kingdom): Honorary Companion of the Order of St Michael and St George (27 November 2012).

See also
List of foreign ministers in 2017

References

External links

|-

|-

1953 births
Ambassadors of Kuwait to Saudi Arabia
Foreign ministers of Kuwait
Government ministers of Kuwait
House of Al-Sabah
Kuwait University alumni
Living people
People from Kuwait City
Permanent Representatives of Kuwait to the United Nations
Prime Ministers of Kuwait
Recipients of orders, decorations, and medals of Sudan